James Whelan may refer to:

 James Roger Whelan (1914–1985), Royal Air Force officer
 James Whelan (Pennsylvania politician) (born 1936), former Republican member of the Pennsylvania House of Representatives
 James Whelan (bishop) (1823–1878), Roman Catholic Bishop of Nashville (1860–1864)
 Jim Whelan (1948–2017), American Democratic Party politician in the New Jersey State Senate
 Jim Whelan (footballer) (1871–1949), Australian rules footballer
 James R. Whelan (1933–2012), journalist and historian
 James Whelan (cyclist) (born 1996), Australian cyclist

See also

 
 Wife to James Whelan (1937 play)
 Whelan (surname)
 Whelan (disambiguation)
 James (disambiguation)